The 2019–20 Virginia Cavaliers men's basketball team represented the University of Virginia during the 2019–20 NCAA Division I men's basketball season. The team was led by head coach Tony Bennett in his 11th year and played their home games at John Paul Jones Arena in Charlottesville, Virginia as members of the Atlantic Coast Conference.

The Cavaliers finished the season 23–7, and 15–5 in ACC play to finish a three-way tie for second place. The team was scheduled to play Notre Dame in the quarterfinals of the ACC tournament before the tournament was canceled due to the COVID-19 pandemic.  The NCAA tournament was also canceled due to the pandemic.

Previous season 
The Cavaliers finished the 2018–19 season 35–3, 16–2 in ACC play to earn a share of the ACC regular season championship. They defeated NC State in the quarterfinals of the ACC tournament before losing to Florida State in the semifinals. They received an at-large bid to the NCAA tournament as the No. 1 seed in the South region. There they defeated Gardner–Webb and Oklahoma to advance to the Sweet Sixteen. They then defeated Oregon and Purdue to advance to the Final Four. In the Final Four, they defeated Auburn to earn a trip to the National Championship game, where they defeated Texas Tech to earn the school's first ever NCAA Championship.

Offseason

Departures

Incoming transfers

2019 recruiting class

Roster

Depth chart

Schedule and results 

Source:

|-
!colspan=12 style=| Regular season

|-
!colspan=12 style=| ACC tournament

Rankings

*AP does not release post-NCAA Tournament rankings

References 

Virginia Cavaliers men's basketball seasons
Virginia
Virginia Cavaliers men's basketball
Virginia Cavaliers men's basketball team